Gerardo Romano (born 6 July 1946) is an Argentine actor who has made some 45 appearances in mainstream film and television in Argentina since 1979.  He is widely regarded as one of Argentina's leading actors.

Romano has mostly appeared on famous television series in Argentina since 1979 making his acting debut in El Fausto criollo, although he has acted in a number of films such as the 1988 Victor Dinenzon film, Abierto de 18 a 24 and the 1994 film El Amante de las Peliculas Mudas.

In 1992 he played the role of the swindler Raúl Fontana in the action thriller Al Filo de la Ley (On the Edge of the Law) about a hotel in Miami.  He also appeared in Spanish film director Carlos Saura's TV film El Sur, which is based on the short story El Sur by Argentine author Jose Luis Borges.

In 1996 Gerardo appeared in the crime thriller Policia corrupto known internationally as Corrupt Police. He portrayed the character of Eduardo Romero.

Then in 2001 he starred in the internationally acclaimed La Fuga playing the role of Julio Bordiola set in the late 1920s. He worked under the directorship of one of the leading Argentine film directors, Eduardo Mignogna and actors Ricardo Darin, Patricio Contreras and Miguel Angel Sola. The film received 5 award wins 11 nominations.

That same year, Romano starred in Nada por Perder in which he portrayed the character of Luis Bustamante.

In 2004 Gerardo Romano appeared in Dos Ilusiones.

Selected filmography
1979 - El Fausto criollo
1984 - Atrapadas, Nacho
1985 - Los Gatos
1986 - Miss Mary
1987 - El año del conejo, Las esclavas, Entregador
1988 - Abierto de 18 a 24, La clínica loca
1990 - Cuerpos perdidos, Negra medianoche, Yo, la peor de todas
1992 - Al Filo de la Ley (1992 film)
1992 - El Sur
1993 - Las boludas
1994 - El amante de las películas mudas
1996 - Policía corrupto
2001 - La fuga, Nada por perder
2004 - Dos ilusiones

References

http://www.cinenacional.com/personas/index.php?persona=8101
http://movies2.nytimes.com/gst/movies/filmography.html?p_id=61284
https://web.archive.org/web/20071102094037/http://www.serials.ru/persons/en/Gerardo_Romano.html

External links
 

Argentine male film actors
Argentine male television actors
Living people
1946 births
Place of birth missing (living people)